Robert Grenier is the name of:
Robert Grenier (poet) (born 1941), contemporary American poet
Robert Grenier (CIA), longtime CIA officer